Breckland is a local government district in Norfolk, England. Its council is based in Dereham. The district had a population of 130,491 at the 2011 Census.

The district derives its name from the Breckland landscape region, a gorse-covered sandy heath of south Norfolk and north Suffolk. The term "Breckland" dates back to at least the 13th century.

The district is predominantly rural, with five market towns - Dereham, Thetford, Attleborough, Swaffham and Watton - and over 100 villages (full list below).

History
Breckland District was formed on 1 April 1974 by the merger of the municipal borough of Thetford, East Dereham Urban District, Swaffham Urban District, Wayland Rural District, Mitford and Launditch Rural District, and Swaffham Rural District.

Politics
The Council consists of 49 Councillors elected every four years, the last election being May 2019.

It is currently controlled by the Conservative Party who won 37 of the 49 seats on the council at the last election.

Leader of the Council

The Leader since May 2019 is  Sam Chapman-Allen (Conservative) (Forest Ward).

The Deputy Leader since May 2019 is Paul Claussen (Conservative) (Mattishall Ward)

Chairman of the Council

The Chairman is  Roy Brame (Thetford Castle Ward)

The Vice-Chairman is  Mike Nairn (Bedingfield . 8, 2005)

Past Chairmen of the Council

2019-2021  Lynda Turner (Shipdham Ward)
2018-2019  Richard Duffield (Lincoln Ward)
2017-2018  Kate Millbank (Dereham Tofwood Ward)
2016-2017  Bill Borrett (Upper Wensum Ward)
2015-2016  Gordon Bambridge (Upper Wensum Ward)
2014-2015  Robert Kybird (Thetford Guildhall Ward)
2013-2014  Paul Claussen (Two Rivers Ward)
2012-2013  Robin Goreham (Dereham Central Ward)
2011-2012  Nigel Wilkin (Necton Ward)

Election Results

For the results of the last election to the council click on this link, Breckland District Council election 2019.

For further information on previous elections click on link, Breckland District Council - Elections

UK Youth Parliament

Although the UK Youth Parliament is an apolitical organisation, the elections are run in a way similar to that of the Local Elections. The votes come from 11 to 18 year olds and are combined to make the decision of the next, 2 year Member of Youth Parliament. The elections are run at different times across the country with Breckland's typically being in early Spring and bi-annually.

The current Member of Youth Parliament for Breckland is Jake Dorman MYP.

Council parishes
The council is entirely parished, and is made up of 113 civil parishes.

The council contains the following civil parishes:

Ashill, Attleborough
Banham, Bawdeswell, Beachamwell, Beeston with Bittering, Beetley, Besthorpe, Billingford, Bintree, Blo' Norton, Bradenham, Brettenham, Bridgham, Brisley, Bylaugh
Carbrooke, Caston, Cockley Cley, Colkirk, Cranwich, Cranworth, Croxton
Didlington, Dereham
East Tuddenham, Elsing
Foulden, Foxley, Fransham
Garboldisham, Garvestone, Gateley, Gooderstone, Great Cressingham, Great Dunham, Great Ellingham, Great Hockham, Gressenhall, Griston, Guist
Hardingham, Harling, Hilborough, Hockering, Hoe, Holme Hale, Horningtoft
Ickburgh
Kempstone, Kenninghall, Kilverstone
Lexham, Litcham, Little Cressingham, Little Dunham, Little Ellingham, Longham, Lynford, Lyng
Mattishall, Merton, Mileham, Mundford
Narborough, Narford, Necton, New Buckenham, Newton by Castle Acre, North Elmham, North Lopham, North Pickenham, North Tuddenham
Old Buckenham, Ovington, Oxborough
Quidenham
Riddlesworth, Rocklands, Rockland St Peter, Roudham and Larling, Rougham
Saham Toney, Scarning, Scoulton, Shipdham, Shropham, Snetterton, South Acre, South Lopham, South Pickenham, Sparham, Sporle with Palgrave, Stanfield, Stanford, Stow Bedon, Sturston, Swaffham, Swanton Morley,
Thetford, Thompson, Tittleshall, Tottington, Twyford
Watton, Weasenham All Saints, Weasenham St. Peter, Weeting-with-Broomhill, Wellingham, Wendling, Whinburgh and Westfield, Whissonsett, Wretham
Yaxham

References

External links

Diss Express - website of local newspaper covering part of district

 
Non-metropolitan districts of Norfolk